"Stay Together" is a 1995 gospel-inspired house song recorded by American singer Barbara Tucker, written and produced by "Little" Louie Vega. This would be Tucker's third of seven number-one singles she would place on the Billboard Hot Dance Club Play chart, reaching the top spot on November 11, 1995. On the UK Singles Chart, the single peaked at 46, while peaking at number 75 in Scotland.

Critical reception
Larry Flick from Billboard wrote, "The enduring Barbara Tucker is back in action with "Stay Together", her third single for New York's Strictly Rhythm Records. This is a tasty all-star package, with production by "Little" Louie Vega and Kenny "Dope" Gonzalez and remixes by Armand Van Helden." He added, "Tucker sounds downright seductive here, which is a nice change from the pulpit-pounding of her last two singles, "Beautiful People" and "I Get Lifted". Do not be fooled, though: Tucker stays positive at all times, never passing up the opportunity to spread her own brand of joy whenever possible." James Hamilton from British magazine Music Weeks RM Dance Update described the song as a "diva wailed garage strider". 

Track listings
 CD maxi (US)'
"Stay Together" (Radio Mix)  4:00  
"Stay Together" (Soulful Mix)  8:27  
"Stay Together" (G-Funk Mix)  4:42  
"Stay Together" (Funky Piano Mix)  8:40  
"Stay Together" (Greed's Euphoric Edit Mix) 6:05  
"Stay Together" (Original Vocal Mix)  6:45  
"Stay Together" (Feliciano Broken "Edit" Mix) 6:15  
"Stay Together" (Armand's Crazy Trauma Mix) 13:00  
"Stay Together" (The Ravin' Mix)  7:25

Charts

References

External links
Official video on YouTube
Single release information at Discogs

1995 singles
1995 songs
Barbara Tucker songs
House music songs
Positiva Records singles